Aldo Mitraj (born 12 January 1987) is an Albanian professional footballer who plays as a forward.

Club career

Early career
Mitraj begun his football career with Dinamo Tirana and is a product of the club's academy.

Partizani Tirana
In July 2013, Mitraj went on a short trial with newly promoted top flight team Partizani Tirana, which he successfully passed, signing a contract until the end of 2013–14 season. He began the season on 31 August by playing as a second half substitute in a 2–0 win at Kastrioti Krujë; it was also Partizani's first top flight match since May 2009.

Apolonia Fier
On 1 February 2014, Mitraj joined Apolonia Fier on a deal until the end of the season with an option to renew for another one. He made his debut six days later, entering as a second half substitute in a league game against Shkumbini Peqin; in dying moments of the match, he was sent-off with a second yellow card. His sent-off, didn't affect the team, who won 1–0. Mitraj's first goal for his new side came in his third appearance for the club on 1 March 2014, a 1–0 win over his future team Tomori Berat. Mitraj was on the scoresheet again on 12 April, scoring another winner, this time against Pogradeci, to give Apolonia three valuable points in their bid to achieve promotion. On 29 December 2014, Mitraj and Apolonia reached an agreement to terminate their cooperation.

Laçi
On 6 January 2015, Mitraj completed a transfer to Laçi as a free agent.

Sopoti Librazhd
On 26 August 2016, Mitraj joined Sopoti Librazhd on a one-year contract. He made his club debut on 24 September in the opening league match home against Apolonia Fier, scoring his team only goal in a 1–2 defeat. During the first part of the season he made 10 league appearances, in addition 2 cup matches, scoring four goals in the process, being the team's top goalscorer. In January 2017, he stated that he was close to return to Laçi, but Sopoti blocked the transfer.

Bylis Ballsh
On 30 January 2017, Mitraj signed with fellow Albanian First Division side Bylis Ballsh until the end of the season.

Tomori Berat
On 13 January 2018, Mitraj was announced as the new Tomori Berat player, returning there after five years and penning a contract running until the end of the season.

Liria Prizren
On 13 August 2018, Mitraj flew off to Kosovo to pen a one-year contract with Liria Prizren. His spell at Football Superleague of Kosovo side was shortlived, as he became a free agent on 8 January of the following year after the parties decided to end their cooperation by mutual consent.

Oriku
After leaving Liria Prizren, Mitraj joined KF Oriku in January 2019.

Arminia Hannover
After a spell at KS Burreli, Mitraj moved to Germany and joined SV Arminia Hannover.

Career statistics

Honours
Laçi
 Albanian Cup: 2014–15
 Albanian Supercup: 2015

References

External links
Aldo Mitraj at the Albanian Football Association
Football Database profile

1987 births
Living people
People from Kolonjë
Association football forwards
Albanian footballers
KF Skënderbeu Korçë players
Luftëtari Gjirokastër players
KS Iliria players
FK Tomori Berat players
FK Partizani Tirana players
KF Apolonia Fier players
KF Laçi players
KS Sopoti Librazhd players
KF Bylis Ballsh players
KF Erzeni players
KF Liria players
KF Oriku players
KS Burreli players
Kategoria e Parë players
Kategoria Superiore players
Football Superleague of Kosovo players
Albanian expatriate footballers
Expatriate footballers in Kosovo
Expatriate footballers in Germany
Albanian expatriate sportspeople in Kosovo
Albanian expatriate sportspeople in Germany